Acmetonia is a community within Harmar Township, Allegheny County, Pennsylvania, United States. Acmetonia Primary School as well as the Allegheny Valley School District administrative offices are located on Pearl Avenue in Acmetonia. The natural southern boundary of Acmetonia is the Allegheny River and the primitive Allegheny Islands State Park is nearby. The community is served by the Cheswick post office with the ZIP code of 15024.

Unincorporated communities in Allegheny County, Pennsylvania
Unincorporated communities in Pennsylvania